This article lists political parties in the Cook Islands. 
The Cook Islands have a two-party system, which means that there are two dominant political parties. It is extremely difficult for candidates to achieve electoral success under the banner of any other party.

Active parties

Cook Islands Party (1965–present)
Democratic Party (1971–present)
One Cook Islands Movement (2014–present)
Progressive Party of the Cook Islands (2019–present)
Cook Islands United Party (2018–present)

Historical parties
Alliance Party (1992–2002)
Cook Islands First Party (2004–2006)
Cook Islands Labor Party (1965)
Cook Islands National Party (2003–2004)
United Political Party (1965)
Democratic Tumu Party (1989–1993)
New Alliance Party (1997–2002)
Party Tumu (2010)
Te Kura O Te ‘Au People's Movement (2010)
Tumu Enua (2004)
United Cook Islanders (UCI) (1968–1970?)

See also

 List of political parties by country

Cook
 
Political parties
Cook Islands
Political parties